Joseph Edward Hendricks (September 24, 1903 – October 20, 1974) was an American lawyer and politician who served six terms as a United States representative from Florida from 1937 to 1949.

Early life and career 
Joe Hendricks was born at Lake Butler, Union County, Florida, where he attended the rural schools and Montverde School. He also attended Stetson University in DeLand, Florida, and graduated with an undergraduate degree in 1930 and a graduate degree from its law department in 1934. Hendricks was admitted to the bar in 1934 and commenced practice in DeLand, Florida.

Hendricks was an attorney for the legal tax survey of Florida in 1934.

Congress 
He was elected as a Democrat to the Seventy-fifth and to the five succeeding Congresses (January 3, 1937 – January 3, 1949) and was not a candidate for renomination in 1948 to the Eighty-first Congress.

Later career and death 
After leaving Congress, he was president of Hendricks Homes, Inc. and chairman of the Planning Board, Plant City, Florida. He was also a member of the County Planning Commission, Hillsborough County, Florida.

He resided in Plant City, Florida until his death in Lakeland, Florida, in 1974. He was buried in Lakeland Memorial Cemetery.

References

External links
 

1903 births
1974 deaths
Democratic Party members of the United States House of Representatives from Florida
People from Lake Butler, Florida
People from Plant City, Florida
20th-century American politicians
Stetson University College of Law alumni